Brocklehurst may  refer to:

In geography:
Brocklehurst, British Columbia, Canada
Brocklehurst Secondary School, Kamloops, British Columbia

In people:
 Andrew Brocklehurst (born 1983), United Kingdom rugby player
 Ben Brocklehurst (1922–2007), English cricketer and publisher
 Danny Brocklehurst (born 1971), English screenwriter
 John Brocklehurst (politician) (1788–1870), English silk manufacturer, banker and Liberal Party politician
 John Brocklehurst, 1st Baron Ranksborough (1852–1921), British soldier, courtier and Liberal politician
 John Brocklehurst (footballer) (1927–2005), English footballer
 Philip Brocklehurst (1887–1975), member of Ernest Shackleton's Nimrod Expedition to Antarctica, grandson of John Brocklehurst (politician)
 William Brocklehurst Brocklehurst (1851–1929), English politician and businessman
 William Coare Brocklehurst (1811–1900), English politician and businessman

In literature:
Mr. Henry Brocklehurst, a character in Jane Eyre by Charlotte Brontë
Mandy Brocklehurst, a Ravenclaw student in the Harry Potter novels

See also
 Mark Dent-Brocklehurst
Brockenhurst, Hampshire, United Kingdom